ČEZ Aréna may refer to:

ČEZ Aréna (Ostrava), in Ostrava, Czech Republic
ČEZ Aréna (Pardubice), in Pardubice, Czech Republic
ČEZ Aréna (Plzeň), in Plzeň, Czech Republic